Cape Huinga is a bold cape overlooking the Ross Ice Shelf, Antarctica, at the north side of the mouth of Robb Glacier. The Southern Party of the New Zealand Geological Survey Antarctic Expedition (1959–60) assembled near the cape in November 1959, thus suggesting the name; "huinga" is a Māori word for a gathering.

References

Headlands of the Ross Dependency
Shackleton Coast